Tvärbanan is a light-rail line in Stockholm, Sweden. Its name literally translates to The transverse line, as it operates crosswise to the otherwise radial metro and commuter rail lines of Stockholm. It links together several transit lines through its connections with the southern, western and northern subway branches of the Stockholm Metro (Tunnelbana) as well as three branches of the Stockholm commuter rail (Pendeltåg). The possibility to travel between southern, western and northern greater Stockholm without having to enter the city centre significantly reduces the number of transit passengers, also reducing the number of trains having to pass through the Old Town bottleneck during peak hours. Near Liljeholmen the track is shared with freight traffic for a short section, this being the only place in Sweden where freight traffic and trams share the same track.

The tramway is separated from roads in most parts, but there are sections in Gröndal, Sundbyberg and Solna where the tracks run on roads among regular road traffic. In Hammarby sjöstad the trams run in a reservation in the centre of the road rather than in mixed traffic, but there are several level crossings.

Traffic on Tvärbanan started in 2000, first between Gullmarsplan and Liljeholmen, then later between Liljeholmen and Alvik, in 2002 between Gullmarsplan and Sickla Udde, and in 2013 between Alvik and Solna centrum. It has later been extended to Solna Station (2014), Sickla (2017) and most recently, Bromma Airport (2021), the last of which being the first part of the new Kista branch. Tvärbanan was used by around 108,000 passengers per weekday in 2019.

Lines
Tvärbanan has two lines (30 and 31). L30 with 26 stops, going from Sickla south of the Stockholm city centre through Gullmarsplan, Liljeholmen, Gröndal, Stora Essingen, Alvik west of the city centre, and Sundbyberg to Solna. The part to Solna Centrum opened 28 October 2013, and the final part to Solna Station opened 18 August 2014. The Friends Arena can be reached within 15 minutes' walk from there. A single-stop extension from Sickla udde to Sickla opened on 2 October 2017, allowing for transfers with the Saltsjöbanan. 

L31 has only 6 stops, going from the station of Alviks strand, passing through Alvik allowing for transfers to the Green line and Nockebybanan, until continuing to Bromma Flygplats. The line opened on the 16th of May 2021 and is planned to be extended further in the near future, with construction underway. The line runs on the same track as line 30 execpt for the branch to Bromma Airport itself. The nearby Bromma Blocks shopping centre is served with a new stop as well.

Main interchange options
Solna Station
Commuter rail lines 40, 41, 42
Solna centrum
Metro blue line 11
Sundbybergs centrum
Metro blue line 10
Commuter rail lines 43, 44
Alvik
Metro green lines 17, 18 and 19
Nockebybanan (light rail line 12)
Liljeholmen
Metro red lines 13 and 14
Årstaberg
Commuter rail lines 40, 41, 42, 43 and 44
Gullmarsplan
Metro green lines 17, 18 and 19
A large number of bus routes to Tyresö, Haninge, Årsta and Södermalm
Sickla
Saltsjöbanan (suburban rail line 25)

Rolling stock

Thirty-seven Bombardier Flexity Swift low-floor trams run on the line (locally called A32). Six of them (432-437) are second hand and imported in 2010 from the RijnGouweLijn-project in the Netherlands. Fifteen new trams were ordered from CAF (locally called A35) and they started operation in October 2013 on the Solna extension.

Signalling system 

A signalling system monitors and controls the movements of rolling stock on a rail network to ensure safe operation. Tvärbanan previously suffered from a long-standing issue of incompatible and low performing rail signalling systems.  The Tvärbanan network featured multiple different signalling systems from different vendors, because when the rail line was built, the signalling systems were tendered separately for each construction stage. A visible example of this was at the Alvik station, which was a break point between two systems. Even though the line runs straight at Alvik, the same train could not be run past the station because of the incompatibility of the systems. Passengers had to switch trains there. The section south of Alvik was closed during the summer of 2017 to upgrade the signalling.

Extension 
Construction on a branch line to Kista and Helenelund started in February 2018. The new branch was scheduled to open its first part to Bromma Airport in December 2020, however this was postponed, as approval from Swedavia was needed in order for the trams to be able to run past the airport. In cold weather, sparks arise from the trams' overhead contact line, which could disrupt radio signals in the air traffic control tower at Bromma Airport. Tests needed to be carried out in sub-zero temperatures to gain approval for traffic.

The first part of the new branch opened on 17 May 2021, with trams running on Line 31 between Alviks strand and Bromma flygplats.

New Stops

Bromma Blocks

Bromma flygplats

Gallery

See also 

 List of tram and light-rail transit systems
 Public transport in Stockholm
 Trams in Stockholm

References

External links
Simplified line map - Official site (Swedish)
Storstockholms Lokaltrafik (Stockholm Transport) - Official site (Swedish)
Stockholm county's page about Tvärbanan - Official site (Swedish)

Rail transport in Stockholm
Tram transport in Sweden
Light rail in Sweden
2000 establishments in Sweden